Gorgoderidae is a family of trematodes in the order Plagiorchiida.

Genera
Family Gorgoderidae
Subfamily Anporrhutinae Looss, 1901
Anaporrhutum Brandes in Ofenheim, 1900
Bicornuata Pearse, 1949
Nagmia Nagaty, 1930
Petalodistomum Johnston, 1913
Plesiochorus Looss, 1901
Probolitrema Looss, 1902
Staphylorchis Travassos, 1922
Subfamily Degeneriinae Cutmore, Miller, Curran, Bennett & Cribb, 2013
Degeneria Campbell, 1977
Subfamily Gorgoderinae Looss, 1899
Gorgodera Looss, 1899
Cetiotrema Manter, 1970
Phyllodistomum Braun, 1899
Pseudophyllodistomum Cribb, 1987
Xystretrum Linton, 1910
Unranked
Dendrorchis Travassos, 1926

References

Plagiorchiida
Trematode families